Icerya is a genus of scale insects in the family Monophlebidae. It is named after physician-naturalist Dr. Edmond Icery of British Mauritius.

Hermaphroditism
Hermaphroditism is extremely rare in the insect world despite the comparatively common nature of this condition in the crustaceans.  Several species of Icerya, including the pestiferous cottony-cushion scale, I. purchasi, are known to be hermaphrodites that reproduce by self-fertilising.  Occasionally males are produced from unfertilised eggs, but generally individuals are monoecious with a female-like nature but possessing an ovotestis (a part-testis, part-ovary organ) and sperm is transmitted ovarially from the female to her young. This hermaphroditic sexual self-sufficiency, where a single individual can populate new territory, has contributed to the invasive spread of the cottony-cushion scale insect away from its native Australia.

List of species
 Icerya aegyptiaca (Douglas 1890).
 Icerya albolutea Cockerell 1898.
 Icerya bimaculata De Lotto 1959.
 Icerya brachystegiae Hall 1940.
 Icerya brasiliensis Hempel 1920.
 Icerya callitri (Froggatt 1921).
 Icerya chilensis Hempel 1920.
 Icerya colimensis Cockerell 1902.
 Icerya flava Hempel 1920.
 Icerya flocculosa Hempel 1932.
 Icerya formicarum Newstead 1897.
 Icerya genistae Hempel 1912.
 Icerya hanoiensis Jashenko & Danzig 1992.
 Icerya imperatae Rao 1951.
 Icerya insulans Hempel 1923.
 Icerya koebelei Maskell 1892.
 Icerya leuderwaldti Hempel 1918.
 Icerya littoralis mimosae Cockerell 1902.
 Icerya littoralis tonilensis Cockerell 1902.
 Icerya littoralis Cockerell 1898.
 Icerya longisetosa Newstead 1911.
 Icerya maxima Newstead 1915.
 Icerya maynei Vayssiere 1926.
 Icerya menoni Rao 1951.
 Icerya minima Morrison 1919.
 Icerya minor Green 1908.
 Icerya montserratensis Riley & Howard 1890.
 Icerya morrisoni Rao 1951.
 Icerya nigroareolata Newstead 1917.
 Icerya palmeri Riley & Howard 1890.
 Icerya paulista Hempel 1920.
 Icerya pilosa Green 1896.
 Icerya pulchra (Leonardi 1907).
 Icerya purchasi citriperda Hempel 1920.
 Icerya purchasi crawii Cockerell 1897.
 Icerya purchasi maskelli Cockerell 1897.
 Icerya purchasi Maskell 1878 - cottony cushion scale
 Icerya rileyi Cockerell 1896.
 Icerya schoutedeni Vayssiere 1926.
 Icerya schrottkyi Hempel 1900.
 Icerya seychellarum (type) (Westwood 1855).
 Icerya seychellarum cristata Newstead 1909.
 Icerya similis Morrison 1923.
 Icerya splendida Lindinger 1913.
 Icerya subandina Leonardi 1911.
 Icerya sulfurea pattersoni Newstead 1917.
 Icerya sulfurea Lindinger 1913.
 Icerya sumatrana Rao 1951.
 Icerya taunayi Hempel 1920.
 Icerya travancorensis Rao 1951.
 Icerya tremae Vayssiere 1926.
 Icerya zeteki Cockerell 1914.
 Icerya zimmermani Green 1932.

References

Monophlebidae
Sternorrhyncha genera